After the previous 2017 Chilean general election in November and December, different polling companies published surveys that tracked voting intention for the 2021 Chilean general election, especially the presidential election. Outgoing president Sebastián Piñera was not eligible for reelection.

Official primaries were held on 18 July where two coalitions, left-wing Apruebo Dignidad and right-wing Chile Vamos, chose their respective presidential candidates Gabriel Boric and Sebastián Sichel. Centre-left coalition New Social Pact held their own primary on 21 August 2021 where they selected Yasna Provoste as their official candidate. Other candidates were José Antonio Kast of the Christian Social Front coalition, Franco Parisi of the Party of the People, Marco Enríquez-Ominami of the Progressive Party, and Eduardo Artés of the Patriotic Union.

The first round of the election took place on 21 November 2021. Since no candidate alone received more than 50% of the votes, a runoff took place on 19 December 2021 between Gabriel Boric and José Antonio Kast. Boric won the runoff with 55.87% of the vote and will assume office on 11 March 2022.

First round

After official registration of candidates 
Results considering only official candidates (excluding "Other", "Don't know", "Do not vote", etc.) and general voters, excluding polls showing likely voters or non-national samples.

Regional polls

Before official registration of candidates 
Graph includes results considering main candidates in polls of general voters (excluding regional polls or with only likely voters). "Other", "Don't know", "Do not vote" or similar options are not included. Average of polls every 14 days.

For this table, the candidates shown are those that have at least one poll with more than 5% of the votes or have been chosen as representative of an official party as their presidential candidate for primaries or the first round.

Second round 
Results considering only official candidates (excluding "Other", "Don't know", "Do not vote", etc.) and general voters, excluding polls only with likely voters. Average of polls every 3 days.

Discarded pairings 

Some polls evaluated a potential second round between candidates that participated in the first round of elections

Some polls included candidates that eventually announced they would not run for office.

Notes

References

See also
President of Chile
Opinion polling for the 2025 Chilean presidential election

2021 in Chile
Opinion polling in Chile